Fair-Rutherford and Rutherford Houses, refers to a set of two historic homes located at Columbia, South Carolina. 
The Fair-Rutherford House was built about 1850, and underwent three alterations during the following century (c. 1879, c. 1905, and c. 1950). It was demolished in 2004.
The two-story Rutherford House was built in 1924–25. They are associated with they prominent African American Rutherford family of Columbia.
The Rutherford House presently serves as an office for Palmetto Dental Services.
It was added to the National Register of Historic Places in 1984.

References

Houses on the National Register of Historic Places in South Carolina
African-American history of South Carolina
Houses completed in 1850
Houses in Columbia, South Carolina
National Register of Historic Places in Columbia, South Carolina